Tall meadow-rue or tall meadow rue may refer to several species of plant in the genus Thalictrum, including:
 Thalictrum dasycarpum
 Thalictrum pubescens
 Thalictrum polycarpum